Kyle Klubertanz (born September 23, 1985) is an American former professional ice hockey defenseman.

Playing career
Klubertanz was selected by the Mighty Ducks of Anaheim in the 3rd round (74th overall) of the 2004 NHL Entry Draft. After graduating from his four-year collegiate career with the University of Wisconsin, Klubertanz made his professional debut on a try-out contract with the Ducks AHL affiliate, the Portland Pirates at the end of the 2007–08 season.

Unsigned from the Ducks, Klubertanz signed a one-year contract in the Finnish SM-liiga with TPS. The following season he moved within Europe to the Swedish Elite League to play with Djurgårdens IF, establishing himself with 32 points, he helped Djurgården to a silver medal finish.

On May 27, 2010, with NHL ambitions he signed a one-year contract with the Montreal Canadiens. Klubertanz was assigned to AHL affiliate, the Hamilton Bulldogs for the duration of the 2010–11 season.

Without an opportunity given with the Canadiens on June 1, 2011, Klubertanz signed a two-year contract to return to Sweden with Djurgården.

After a single season with KHL Medveščak Zagreb of the Kontinental Hockey League, Klubertanz opted to sign in Germany, in agreeing to two-year deal with the Nürnberg Ice Tigers of the Deutsche Eishockey Liga (DEL) on July 2, 2014. When his contract was up, he joined fellow DEL side Krefeld Pinguine, signing on July 1, 2016. In the following 2016–17 season, Klubertanz struggled to find his offensive game in Krefeld, collecting just 1 goal and 13 points in 47 games as the team languished at the bottom of the table. On February 15, 2017, Klubertanz was released from his contract in Krefeld and signed with neighbouring league the EBEL with EHC Black Wings Linz.

Career statistics

Regular season and playoffs

International

Awards and honors

References

External links

1985 births
American men's ice hockey defensemen
Anaheim Ducks draft picks
Djurgårdens IF Hockey players
EHC Black Wings Linz players
Green Bay Gamblers players
Hamilton Bulldogs (AHL) players
HC TPS players
HIFK (ice hockey) players
Ice hockey players from Wisconsin
KHL Medveščak Zagreb players
Krefeld Pinguine players
Living people
Portland Pirates players
Thomas Sabo Ice Tigers players
Vienna Capitals players
Wisconsin Badgers men's ice hockey players